Night Season by Eileen Wilks, is the 7th book in the World of the Lupi series. It was released in March 2008.

Plot introduction
When two world-class cynics land in a world where magic is commonplace, lying is an artform, and night never ends, their only way home lies in working together to find a missing medallion sought by powerful beings who would do anything to claim it.

Characters
Cynna Weaver - a Finder whose image decorates the cover of Blood lines. The tattoos are how Cynna works her special brand of magic.
Cullen Seabourne - a recent adoption to Rule's Nokolai werewolf clan. Cullen was clanless for many years. He is also a sorcerer, which is a slightly illegal pastime according to the federal authorities. Eileen describes him as sin incarnate to look at.
Gan - part demon, part something new, Gan always says what's on her mind, and will do anything for chocolate.

References

External links
Eileen Wilks Official website

World of the Lupi books
American fantasy novels
Novels by Eileen Wilks
2008 American novels